Uganda competed at the 1988 Summer Olympics in Seoul, South Korea.

Competitors
The following is the list of number of competitors in the Games.

Athletics

Men
Track & road events

Field events

Women
Track & road events

Boxing

Men

Weightlifting

Men

References

Official Olympic Reports

Nations at the 1988 Summer Olympics
1988
1988 in Ugandan sport